My Maryland is a "musical romance" with book and lyrics by Dorothy Donnelly and music by Sigmund Romberg, based on the play Barbara Frietchie by Clyde Fitch.

Production
My Maryland was staged by J. C. Huffman.
Produced by Lee Shubert and J. J. Shubert, the Broadway production, opened on September 12, 1927 at Jolson's 59th Street Theatre and then moved to the Casino Theatre for a total run of 312 performances. The cast included Nathaniel Wagner, George Rosener, Evelyn Herbert and over 65 others.

Songs

Act I
 Strolling with the One I Love the Best
 Mr. Cupid
 Won't You Marry Me?
 Your Land and My Land
 The Same Silver Moon
 The Mocking Bird

Act II
 Strawberry Jam
 Mexico
 Something Old, Something New
 Old John Barleycorn

Act III
 Song of Victory
 Ker-Choo!
 Boys in Gray
 Mother
 Bonnie Blue Flag
 Hail Stonewall Jackson

References

External links
 

1927 musicals
Broadway musicals
Musicals based on plays
Musicals by Sigmund Romberg